Timothy Williams (born July 30, 1967) is an American actor and screenwriter.

Career
Williams was born in Richmond, Virginia. By the time he was a teenager, he had entered the world of live theater in New York City, winning parts in several plays that ran at Joseph Papp's Public Theater. It was there he performed in original  plays with Fisher Stevens and Keith Gordon. He also appeared in productions at the New York Theater Ensemble with Daniel Stern and John Randolph, and wrote his own stage play, No Title (Yet), which had a run of performances at the Stella Adler Conservatory in the spring of 1983, directed by Ron Burrus.

In December 1983, Williams moved to Los Angeles to seek television and film work. By 1985 he had landed guest roles on primetime series such as Cagney & Lacey and Simon & Simon, and appeared in the TV movies Club Med, Welcome Home, Bobby and Disney's Splash Too. However, it was his repeat guest turn on Cheers starting in 1986 that garnered him notoriety, in which he played Anthony Tortelli, the son of Cheers waitress Carla Tortelli (Rhea Perlman). In late 1986, after a year and a half of Cheers guest appearances, Williams was moved, along with fellow guest stars Dan Hedaya and Jean Kasem, into the spin-off series The Tortellis. The show not only provided Williams with his first regular series role, but it also gave him his first television writing job; he wrote the series' twelfth (and next-to-last) episode, "Innocent as Charged".  The Tortellis was cancelled by NBC in the spring of 1987 after 13 episodes.

Williams soon continued his TV series writing when he was hired by another Paramount-produced sitcom, the Showtime series Brothers. Williams wrote eight episodes of Brothers, and served as a script consultant for the next two seasons, until the series ended production in the spring of 1989. For the show's final season, Williams took a regular on-screen role as Mike Chandler, a young lawyer who becomes the steady boyfriend of Penny Waters (Hallie Todd).

In the late 1980s and early 1990s, Williams wrote for additional TV series such as Normal Life, Married People, Bobby's World, Big Brother Jake, Richie Rich (11 episodes), and Salute Your Shorts. He also continued acting in guest appearances on Saved by the Bell, Doogie Howser, M.D., Crusade and Coach.

Williams was also the "ghost writer" of several books, including My So-Called Career in Hollywood, a darkly comedic autobiography of ill-fated 1960's TV writer Ellery Klass, and I Am Not Lost in Space!, a tie-in novelization based on the original Lost in Space TV series. Williams also penned movie tie-in novels for the films Born to Be Wild and Running Free. In 2005 and 2007, he was the winner of the Governor's Screenwriting Competition. His 2005 winning entry, Nunley, was acquired by producer Bernard Williams and his 2007 winning entry, The Way Things Turn was acquired by producers Gross-Weston.

In 2012, Williams' screenplay Tell was purchased by American Film Productions, with J.M.R Luna set as director. The film, starring Milo Ventimiglia, Jason Lee and Katee Sackhoff, was released by Orion Pictures in 2014.

Tell was released on DVD and Blu-ray in March 2017.

In 2018 his Hallmark teleplay A Lot Like Christmas was put in development by producer Christina DeRosa.

References

American male television actors
1967 births
Living people
20th-century American male actors
Male actors from Richmond, Virginia